was a town located in Natori District, Miyagi Prefecture from 1967 to 1988. It is now the western part of Taihaku-ku, Sendai.

Geography 
Most of the town limits are forest, and it is the drainage basin of Natori River. The town has many tourism resources from Akiu Waterfalls to Rairaikyo, to Akiu Hot Springs and Futakuchi Hot Springs.
 Mountain Peaks - Mount Kamuro (1,356m), Mount Ōkura (433m), Mount Taihaku (321m)
 Rivers - Natori River, Zaru River

Surrounding municipalities 
 Miyagi Prefecture
 Sendai
 Kawasaki
 Yamagata Prefecture
 Yamagata
 Higashine

History 
 1947 - The villages of Nikkawa (新川村), (馬場村), (長袋村), (境野村) and (湯元村) merged to become the village of Akiu.
 1955 - Former village of Nikkawa area was moved to the village of Miyagi.
 1967 - Becomes the town of Akiu.
 1988 - Absorbed by the city of Sendai.

Transportation

Railroads 
 Akiu Electronic Railway Akiu Line (cancelled in 1961)
 Rairaikyō - Akiu Hot Springs

Road

National Highways 
 Route 457

Tourist Attractions-Historic Sites 
 Akiu Waterfall
 Akiu Hot Springs
 Futakuchi Hot Springs
 Rairaikyō

Food 
Akiu is known locally for its tofu, which comes packaged in a piece of bamboo.

Akiu
Sendai